Under the Whyte notation for the classification of steam locomotives by wheel arrangement, a  is a Garratt articulated locomotive. The wheel arrangement is effectively two 4-4-2 locomotives operating back to back, with each power unit having four leading wheels on two axles in a leading bogie, four powered and coupled driving wheels on two axles, and two trailing wheels on one axle in a trailing truck. Since the 4-4-2 type is usually known as an Atlantic, the corresponding Garratt type is often referred to as a Double Atlantic.

Overview
The  was not a common Garratt wheel arrangement. Only ten were built, all by Beyer, Peacock & Company, the owner of the Garratt patent.

Usage

Argentina
 Five were built for the Entre Ríos Railway in 1927.
 Another three were built for the Argentine North Eastern Railway in 1930.

After nationalization in 1948, all these locomotives were rostered on the General Urquiza Railway.

Australia
The first Garratt locomotives to be built to the  wheel arrangement were a pair of M class passenger locomotives for the  gauge Tasmanian Government Railways in Australia in 1912. They were acquired to haul express passenger trains between Launceston and Hobart.

The two M class engines were the only eight-cylinder Garratt locomotives in the world. They were difficult to maintain and, despite their haulage abilities and speed, both were withdrawn from service some time after the arrival of the R class in 1924 and scrapped in the late 1940s.

References

External links

4,4-4-2
44,4-4-2+2-4-4